Two destroyers of the Imperial Japanese Navy have been named Kamikaze:

See also
 Kamikaze (disambiguation)
 

Imperial Japanese Navy ship names
Japanese Navy ship names